Aleksi Bardy (born 24 September 1970 in Helsinki, Finland) is a Finnish television writer, screenwriter and film producer. He has been a political activist on the left of the political spectrum (Left Alliance), once standing in elections for the Finnish parliament.

Career
Bardy is probably best known for writing the script for the 2006 film Saippuaprinssi working with film director Janne Kuusi. The starring actors such as Mikko Leppilampi and Pamela Tola and most recently the TV  series "Käenpesä".

Filmography
 Heart of a Lion (2013)
 Ja saapuu oikea yö (2012), producer
 Lapland Odyssey (2010), producer
 Forbidden Fruit (2009), writer and producer
 Tears of April (2008), producer
 The Border (2007), writer
 Ganes (2007), producer
 The Emperor's Secret (2006), script writer and producer
 Saippuaprinssi (2006), script
 Beauty and the Bastard (2005), producer
 Kukkia ja sidontaa (2004), script writer and co-producer
 Young Gods (2003), script editor and producer
 Restless (2000), script
 The Tough Ones (1999), script
 Tove (2020), producer
 Reunion 3: Singles Cruise (2021), script

TV series credits
 Moscow Noir (2018) 
Kukkia ja sidontaa (2006) 
 Käenpesä (2004) 
 Itse valtiaat (2001)
 Salatut elämät (1998)
 Tähtitehdas (1998)
 Laskettu aika (1996)
 Kotikatu (1995)
 Let's Play Zeus (1994)

References

External links

1970 births
Living people
Film people from Helsinki
Left Alliance (Finland) politicians
Finnish film producers
Finnish television writers
Finnish screenwriters
Finnish television producers
Businesspeople from Helsinki
Aalto University School of Arts, Design and Architecture alumni